Emin Huseynov may refer to:

 Emin Huseynov (journalist) (born 1979), Azerbaijani journalist and human rights activist
 Emin Huseynov (economist) (born 1974), Azerbaijani economist and politician